The 2012 NASCAR Canadian Tire Series season was the sixth season of the NASCAR Canadian Tire Series taking place in the summer of 2012. The season composed of twelve races at eleven different venues. Seven of those events were contested on oval courses.

Summary
The sixth season consisted of 12 events spanning across 5 provinces featuring 12 events. New this season were the standardised rule changes for NASCAR's regional series matching that of the national series (green-white-checker finish and points system). All of the races were aired on TSN in one-hour tape-delayed episodes, excluding Circuit Gilles Villeneuve and Trois-Rivières being aired live on the network.

The season started on May 20 at the Canadian Tire Motorsport Park with J. R. Fitzpatrick winning his first event in almost 2 years, Andrew Ranger also returned to victory lane the following week at Circuit ICAR. D. J. Kennington went to win a NASCAR touring record of 5 consecutive races at Canadian Tire Motorsport Park, Delaware Speedway, Motoplex Speedway, Edmonton Indy and Auto Clearing Motor Speedway. Ranger and Fitzpatrick won the two premier road course events at Circuit Trois-Rivieres and Circuit Gilles Villeneuve in August. Then at Barrie Speedway, Peter Shepherd III took advantage of an accident involving leaders Steve Matthews and Fitzpatrick, who were involved in an accident on a green-white-checker finish to pick up the Victory. Points leader Kennington suffered a mechanical failure and finished down in the running order but rebounded strong winning the final two events of the year at Kawartha and Riverside capturing 2 championships in 3 years.

Drivers

Schedule

Results

Races

Final championship standings

(key) Bold – Pole position awarded by time. Italics – Pole position earned by points standings. * – Most laps led.

1 – Michel Pilon received championship points, despite the fact that he withdrew from the race after an injury in practice.

2 – Dave Coursol, Brandon White, David Thorndyke, Dave Connelly and Isabelle Tremblay received championship points, despite the fact that they did not qualify for the race.

See also
 2012 NASCAR Sprint Cup Series
 2012 NASCAR Nationwide Series
 2012 NASCAR Camping World Truck Series
 2012 NASCAR K&N Pro Series East
 2012 NASCAR Toyota Series
 2012 NASCAR Stock V6 Series
 2012 Racecar Euro Series

References

External links
Canadian Tire Series Standings and Statistics for 2012

NASCAR Canadian Tire Series season

NASCAR Pinty's Series